Grijó is a former civil parish in the municipality of Vila Nova de Gaia, Portugal. In 2013, the parish merged into the new parish Grijó e Sermonde. The population in 2011 was 10,578, in an area of 11.33 km². It is the birthplace of André Gomes who plays for Everton FC.

History 
Grijó was the seat of a municipality until the beginning of the 19th century. The municipality was composed of a single parish and, in 1801, had 1,523 inhabitants.

History 

In 10–11 May 1809, in the context of the Peninsular war, the Battle of Grijó took place near the town of Grijó.

See also 

 Tourism in Vila Nova de Gaia
 Municipalities of Portugal

References

Former parishes of Vila Nova de Gaia